The Notre Dame Church is a church in Șimleu Silvaniei, Romania. The church was built by the Romanian Greek Catholic community between 1871 and 1873. The iconostasis and peinture were completed in 1893, while Alimpiu Barboloviciu served as vicar.

Photos

References

External links
 Scurt istoric al Vicariatului Silvaniei

Places of worship in Șimleu Silvaniei
Greek-Catholic churches in Romania
Monuments and memorials in Șimleu Silvaniei
Roman Catholic churches completed in 1873
Churches in Sălaj County
1873 establishments in Europe
19th-century Roman Catholic church buildings in Romania